Faster Than Light (FTL) was a software publishing label established by UK video game publisher Gargoyle Games. The aim was for FTL to publish arcade-style games, while Gargoyle would concentrate on its core business of adventure games.

Games
Light Force (1986) was a vertically scrolling shoot 'em up with a large main ship. The player had to survive alien attacks in four different sectors of the planet Regulus.
Hydrofool (1987) was an isometric 3D game set in a giant aquarium, and a sequel to the similar (though drier) Sweevo's World. The player had to avoid fish and collect objects with the ultimate aim of pulling out enough plugs to drain the aquarium.
Shockway Rider (1987) was set in the future, where gangs of thugs roamed the moving walkways built around a huge city. The player had to collect weapons and bonus objects, and go "full circle" by surviving the perilous journey through the eight districts.

References

External links

Video game publishers
Defunct video game companies of the United Kingdom